One Step Behind is a 1997 crime novel by Swedish author Henning Mankell, the seventh in his acclaimed Inspector Wallander series.

In 2002, the book was a finalist for the Los Angeles Times Book Prize for Mystery/Thriller.

Synopsis
Two young women and one young man, inexplicably dressed as the nobility of Sweden did during the reign of Gustavus III, are found dead, each slain with a single bullet, their bodies half consumed by animals in the wilderness. Wallander is horrified when he makes a connection between the crime and his close friend and colleague Svedberg, who is then found savagely murdered in his own home. Tormented by his own loss, the detective is nevertheless startled that the connection to Svedberg unravels into revelations about himself he never could have possibly imagined, all amidst the pitting of the Ystad police against a deranged, merciless killer who remains just one step ahead...

Adaptation 
In 2005, One Step Behind was adapted by Swedish public broadcaster Sveriges Television into a theatrical film, starring Rolf Lassgård as Wallander. In 2008, British broadcaster BBC One broadcast a 90-minute adaptation as part of its Wallander television series starring Kenneth Branagh.

References 

1997 Swedish novels
Novels by Henning Mankell
Wallander
Novels set in Sweden
Ordfront books